Jacob Banks (born 24 July 1991) is a Nigerian-born English singer and songwriter from Birmingham. Banks won the 2012 MOBO UnSung regional competition in Birmingham and the Adidas "Are You In" music competition. His music is influenced by a range of genres including soul, R&B and hip hop. Banks is currently signed with American label Interscope Records.

Music career

2012–present: Breakthrough
 The second release from The Monologue, titled "Worthy", was played by BBC Radio 1 DJ Zane Lowe as his "Next Hype" record on his Radio 1 show and received additional plays on 1Xtra, XFM, 6Music and Annie Nightingale. In April 2013, Banks played his first headline show at the London St Pancras Old Church. He supported Emeli Sande on her April 2013 UK tour. Banks features on Wretch 32's song "Doing OK", the second single from Wretch's forthcoming third studio album. Banks features on Chase and Status' "Alive" from their album, Brand New Machine. He also supported them, on their Brand New Machine 2013 UK tour. Banks announced he was to release a joint EP featuring himself, Wretch 32 and George the Poet titled Gambling Man in 2013. However, this did not occur. On 1 May 2014, his collaboration with All About She, "I Can Wait", was released for free download as part of their debut extended play Go Slow. Banks has also worked with other artists such as Bondax, Jake Gosling, Knox Brown, Plan B and Wretch 32.

On 21 July 2015, Banks' second extended play entitled The Paradox was released. It features a guest appearance from Odd Child Recordings rapper Avelino on the track "Monster".

In 2016, Banks was featured on Norwegian production team Seeb's release, "What Do You Love". The song reached number 2 on VG-lista, the official Norwegian singles chart.

On 9 March 2017, Banks premiered his two-part narrative video, written and co-directed by himself, for his single, "Unholy War". The single is off his upcoming EP, 'The Boy Who Cried Freedom'.
In November 2018, he released his new album, "Village", which made No. 1 on new and upcoming albums on Spotify.

In popular culture

Banks' song, "Monster 2.0" was featured in the Codemasters game, Dirt 4.

"Move With You" was featured in the EA Sports game, FIFA 15.

In 2013, "Worthy" was played on the American TV series Suits in season 3, episode 9.

"Unknown" was featured in the Season 3 finale of the Starz TV series Power, and received viral attention for his tremendous voice. This attention led to the song "Monster" featuring in the first episode of season 4. 

In 2021, “Unknown” was featured on A spinoff of the Power Series Power Book 2: Ghost Season 2 Episode 5.

In 2018, "Unknown" was featured during the TV Series Suits in season 7, episode 13.

"Monster" was used during the TV series "Quantico" in Season 1 Episode 2 which aired in October 2015. "Monster" was also sampled to create rapper Flawless real talk's song of the same name.

In 2017, "Unholy War" was featured in the season finale of the TV series  Redemption, Season 3 Episode 3 of the TV Series Lucifer and in the reveal trailer for the 2017 Need for Speed game, Need for Speed: Payback. In 2018, "Unholy War" was featured during the season 1 finale of the TV series Black Lightning. It was also featured on the Starz TV series Power.

In 2018 Banks penned and performed the song "In The Name of Love" for the movie The Equalizer 2.

"Love Ain't Enough" was used in the EA Sports game, FIFA 19.

Banks' collaboration with X Ambassadors, "Baptize Me" was featured in the 'Game of Thrones' soundtrack.

In 2018, "Unholy War" was used in the TV series "Queen of the South" in season 3, episode 5.

In 2019, "Every Age" was featured in a commercial for the gum brand Extra.

In 2020, "Slow Up" was used in the second season of the British series "Save Me".

In 2021, "Slow Up" was used in the Netflix film Fatherhood, "Found " was featured in the final season of Lucifer, and "Something Beautiful" was featured in feature film, Tom & Jerry.

In 2019, "Unknown (To You)" was used in the TV series The Resident in season 2, episode 20.

Discography

Albums

Extended plays

Singles

As lead artist

As featured artist

Other appearances

References

External links

Musicians from Birmingham, West Midlands
1991 births
Living people
Nigerian emigrants to the United Kingdom
English people of Nigerian descent
British hip hop singers
21st-century Black British male singers
Interscope Records artists